This is a list of equipment of the Navy of the Islamic Revolutionary Guard Corps.

Principal surface combatants

Amphibious ships

Auxiliary ships

Patrol speedboat forces

See also

 List of former Iranian naval vessels
 List of current ships of the Islamic Republic of Iran Navy

References

Lists of ships of Iran
Ships

Iran